Cave Valley is an extinct town in Lincoln County, in the U.S. state of Nevada.

History
A post office was established at Cave Valley in 1926, and remained in operation until 1933. The community takes its name from its location in the Cave Valley.

References

Ghost towns in Lincoln County, Nevada